Jay Hunt (August 4, 1855 – November 18, 1932) was an American film director and actor. He directed nearly 70 films between 1911 and 1919. He continued his career as an actor until 1931. The White Squaw, a 1920 film directed by Hunt, was preserved by the Academy Film Archive in 2011.

Selected filmography

 Star of the North (1914)
 The Man Who Went Out (1915)
 Civilization (1916)
 The Black Sheep of the Family (1916)
 The Promise (1917) 
 My Lady Robin Hood (1919) - directed
 Yankee Speed (1924)
 Wanted by the Law (1924)
 Lightnin' (1925)
 Counsel for the Defense (1925)
 The Gentle Cyclone (1926)
 A Man Four-Square (1926)
 Men of the Night (1926)
 3 Bad Men (1926)
 The Golden Web (1926)
 The Harvester (1927)
 The Overland Stage (1927)
 Captain Salvation (1927)
 The Poor Millionaire (1930)
 The Cheyenne Cyclone (1931)

References

External links

1855 births
1932 deaths
American male film actors
Film directors from Pennsylvania
Male actors from Philadelphia
20th-century American male actors